A culm bomb (also culm ball, depending on location in Ireland) is a compressed ball of culm mixed with yellow clay as a binding agent. For roughly 400 years, culm bombs were used in Irish industry (e.g. blacksmith's forges and grain drying) and for domestic use around the major coal mining areas of Ireland (e.g. Castlecomer and Ballingarry).

In domestic use, culm bombs were often hand made by those who used them as coal finings could be bought (or found) more cheaply than buying coal. The yellow clay used to bind the culm could be dug up in a field, being common to the areas in which culm bombs were made.

When large quantities of bombs were being made the process was somewhat mechanised by using a culm crusher drawn by a horse. Otherwise, for smaller batches used by a single family the process was entirely manual, with a person wearing a strong pair of boots trampling the culm and clay mixture, which was known as "dancing the culm" as it required a person to tread the culm and clay together until it was ready to be made into bombs.

When the culm was sufficiently prepared it was hand formed into bombs, about the size of a hand grenade (hence the term bomb), and left out to dry in the sun. Bombs were then stacked on a fire started with kindling in much the same way a coal fire is sustained.

The use of culm bombs lasted well into the middle of 20th century Ireland by which time Ireland's coal seams were becoming depleted and affordable alternatives for heating the house (e.g. mass-produced peat briquettes for ranges, oil and natural gas for hot water boilers) and cooking facilities improved with natural gas and the electricity grid.

References

Irish culture
Coal